The Paraguayan Army is the ground force branch of the Armed Forces of Paraguay. It is organized into three corps and nine divisions, and several commands and direction. It has gone to war on many occasions, notably in the War of the Triple Alliance (1864–1870) against Brazil, Argentina and Uruguay; the Chaco War against Bolivia; and the ongoing Paraguayan People's Army insurgency.

Mission 

 Maintaining the sanctity of the land borders of the Republic of Paraguay.
 To strengthen civil-military relations.
 Cooperate in emergency rescue and relief operations during disasters.
 Organize, compose and manage reservations.
 To organize, equip and train strength to face any domestic or international threat/
 Cooperate in activities to support the country's national development.
 To cooperate with scientific and technological development of the country.

History 

Paraguay's army was formally established in 1811, the year of the country's independence. For the first several years of Paraguay's existence the commanders of the army, such as Fulgencio Yegros and Pedro Juan Caballero, formed the majority of the cabinet until 1814, when they were replaced by Dr. José Gaspar Rodríguez de Francia, who installed himself as supreme dictator for life after a series of political clashes with Yegros. Francia removed all army personnel from the government and reformed the army, which was by now inept and corrupt. He limited the power of the army by declaring that no rank above captain could be achieved, and that after three years of service officers were to be retired. By 1816 there were no officers in the army who had fought at the Tacuarí or the Paraguarí. 
Francia's horse-grenadier guard company was the first new unit created and was to form the nucleus of the army. Each captain was given command of a branch of the service, which consisted of line infantry, light infantry, dragoons, chasseurs, hussars and artillery. The infantry, artillery and hussars were stationed in the capital Asunción, and the rest of the army was stationed in outposts around the country to defend from attacks by Indians. The cavalry would go dismounted during peacetime, and were distinguished by the yellow aiguillette sewn onto their left shoulder. Although no formal wars were fought, conflicts with the Chaco Indians, particularly the sub-groups of the Guaykuru tribes, raged in the borderlands. 
The size of the army varied according to the magnitude of threat. In 1825 it was 5000 strong, but in 1834 it was only 649 strong. There was also a large number of militia troops, which usually numbered around 25,000.

After Francia's death in 1840, Carlos Antonio López assumed power and modernized the army and expanded the navy. He opened an iron foundry at Ybycuí that produced arms and bullets and also built up a railway system in the country to transport troops and materiel.

Following the succession of Lopez's son, Francisco Solano López, the army was expanded yet further until it was one of the largest in South America, consisting by 1864 of 44 infantry battalions, 46 cavalry regiments and four artillery regiments. In that same year Paraguay fought its first actual war against Brazil, Uruguay and Argentina. Despite numerical superiority and initial success, the allies soon upped their game and Paraguay eventually found itself surrounded. Despite constant defeat on the field by the allies, the Paraguayans did not capitulate until Lopez had been killed in 1870, on the run with his 200 remaining men.

Presence in UN Missions 

 Haiti (MINUSTAH)
 Cyprus (UNIFICYP)
 Democratic Republic of the Congo (MONUC)
 Chad Central African Republic (MINURCAT)
 Ivory Coast (ONUCI)

Structure 

As of 2016, the Paraguayan Army had a total strength of 10,600 personnel, including 2,500 conscripts.

The Paraguayan Army is composed of Presidential Guard Regiment, organized into a regimental HQ, two battalions (infantry and military police), an armored squadron and a battery of field artillery (plus the Mounted Ceremonial Squadron "Aca Caraya"). The regimental equipment includes three Argentine modified M4 Sherman tanks, four EE-9 armored cars, four EE-11 armored personnel carriers (APCs), three M-9 halftracks mounting 20mm guns and four M-101 105 mm howitzers. Arguably, this "flagship" unit is structurally and physically the strongest of the whole of the Army. The REP is an independent unit from other commands. The EP features two field artillery groups (GAC 1–12 88 mm QF-25 and GAC 2–12 105mm M-101) and one air defense artillery group (GAA 13 40 mm L 40/60, Oerlikon 20 mm cannons, and six M-55 4×12, 7.0 mm).

Six battalions of combat engineers, one communications battalion, one Special Forces battalion, seven regiments of infantry and six regiments of cavalry comprise the rest of the force. There is little organic aviation available to it.

Each corps has a weapons school run by its command. The logistical command manages and addresses materials, mobilization, health care, etc. The command of the Army Institute of Education administers three schools, commissioned and noncommissoned officers, a military academy and the CIMEFOR (a center for pre-military study that trains Reserve officers).

Each of the nine divisions that make up the three corps has one or two regiments of infantry or cavalry, its platoon of engineers, its communications section, military police units, etc.

 Presidential Guard Regiment with its base in Asunción
1st Army Corps (Curuguaty)
Infantry Division 3
Infantry Division 4
Cavalry Division 3
2nd Army Corps (San Juan Bautista)
Infantry Division 1
Infantry Division 2
Cavalry Division 2
3rd Army Corps (Mariscal Estigarribia)
Infantry Division 5
Infantry Division 6
Cavalry Division 1
Special forces command (Cerrito)
One Special Forces battalion and one Special Forces school.
Army Artillery command (Paraguari)
Two artillery groups and one anti-aircraft group, one artillery school.
 The Infantry School and the Infantry Training Battalion.
 Army Command of engineers (Tacumbu)
One school and six battalions.
Army communications command(Tacumbu)
One school and one signal battalion.
 Army Training and Doctrine Command
Operates the Francisco López Military Academy, three military schools, and a noncommissoned officers school
Army logistic command (Asunción)
The logistic command manages and addresses materials, mobilization, health care, etc.

Equipment

Armored vehicles

Logistic vehicles

Artillery pieces and mortars

Anti-armor weapons

Small arms

Ranks 

It is important to note that the two most famous military leaders of Independent Paraguay, Francisco Solano López (during his own lifetime) and José Félix Estigarribia (after his death) were distinguished with the rank of Field Marshal of the Paraguayan Armies. However, this rank is just a "honorific distinction" for these two individuals who led the nation during the largest military conflicts Paraguay had to face, the Paraguayan War and the Chaco War.

Moreover, it is unknown if they ever had the garments of a Field Marshal. Solano López only received a "Marshal's Baton" but he kept wearing the uniform of a General of the Army while Estigarribia, apparently, never got nor received any type of Marshal's garments other than the honorific rank.

Officially, both Solano López and Estigarribia held the rank of General of the Armies of Paraguay.

Commissioned officer ranks
The rank insignia of commissioned officers.

Other ranks
The rank insignia of non-commissioned officers and enlisted personnel.

See also
Armed Forces of Paraguay

References
Notes

Works cited

External links
 Official website
 Ministry of National Defence
 Fuerzas Armadas de Paraguay - SAORBATS

Paraguay
Military units and formations established in 1811
Military of Paraguay